Prabandha-Kosha (IAST: Prabandhakośa) is an Indian Sanskrit-language collection of prabandhas (legendary biographical narratives). It was compiled by the Jain scholar Rajashekhara Suri in 1349 CE. It describes the lives of 24 people, including 10 Jain scholars, 4 Sanskrit poets, 7 kings and 3 Jain householders. It is also known as Chaturvinshati Prabandha.

The content of the collection is based on the information that Rajashekhara obtained from his teacher Tilakasuri. He composed the work at Delhi, under the patronage of Madanasimha, whose father had been honoured by Shri Mahamad Shahi (probably Muhammad Tughluq).

Only the 7th prabandha in the collection (the one about Mallavadi-Suri) is written completely in verse form; the rest of the prabandhas use colloquial Sanskrit prose.

Content 

The Prabandha-Kosha contains 24 prabandhas (anecdotes), with 4,300 shlokas (verses), on the following persons:

Suris (Jain scholars) 

 Bhadrabahu and Varaha
 Aryanandila
 Jivadeva-Suri
 Aryakhapata Acharya
 Padaliptacharya
 Siddhasena-Suri and Vriddhavadi
 Mallavadi-Suri
 Haribhadra-Suri
 Bappabhatti-Suri
 Hemachandra-Suri

Poets 

 Harsha
 Harihara
 Amarachandra
 Madanakirti

Kings 

 Satavahana
 Vankachula
 Vikramaditya
 Nagarjuna
 Udayana
 Lakshmana-Sena (or Lakshana-Sena) Kumaradeva
 Madanavarman

Jain householders / courtiers 

 Ratna-Shravaka
 Abhada-Shravaka
 Vastupala and Tejapala

References

Bibliography 

 
 
 
 
 
 

Sanskrit literature
14th-century books
Medieval Indian literature